The 2017 Rochester Rhinos season was the club's 22nd overall and seventh with the United Soccer League, now known as the USL Championship. The Rhinos returned to playing in Division II of men's professional soccer, as the USL and all its teams were promoted from Division III after the 2016 season. They looked to return to the USL playoffs after losing to the New York Red Bulls II in the conference semifinals the previous year.

This was the Rhinos' final season in the second tier of American professional soccer. The team initially announced that it would go on hiatus for the 2018 season. It later announced that it would not resume professional operations until 2020, at which time it will join USL League One, a third-level league operated by USL's parent company, United Soccer League (not to be confused with the Rhinos' former league), that will play its first season in 2019.

Roster
as of June 25, 2017

Competitions

Preseason

Regular season

Standings 
Eastern Conference

Match results 

All times in Eastern Time.

Playoffs

References

Rochester Rhinos
Rochester Rhinos
Rochester Rhinos
Rochester New York FC seasons